Road Rage may refer to:

 Road rage, a driving phenomenon

Music 
 Road Rage (Great Big Sea album), 2000
 Road Rage (EP), a 1997 EP by Area-7
 Roadrage 2003, a video compilation from Roadrunner Records
 "Road Rage" (song), a single released by the Welsh band Catatonia in 1998
 "Road Rage", a song by Dizzee Rascal from Tongue n' Cheek
 Road Rage (Quiet Riot album), 2017
 "Road Rage", a song by Young Thug from Punk, 2021

Other media 
 Road Rage (film), a 1999 movie starring Yasmine Bleeth
 Road Rage (audiobook), a 2009 audiobook including short stories by Richard Matheson and Stephen King / Joe Hill
 Road Rage (novel), a 1997 novel by Ruth Rendell
 Road Rage (1995 video game), by Konami
 Road Rage (video game), a 2017 video game developed by Team6 Game Studios and published by Maximum Games
 The Simpsons: Road Rage, a 2001 video game

 Road Rage (Kinnikuman), a fictional character in the anime and manga Kinnikuman (Ultimate Muscle)

See also 
 AEW Road Rager, an annual professional wrestling special by All Elite Wrestling (AEW)